is a railway station in the city of  Noshiro, Akita, Japan, operated by the East Japan Railway Company (JR East).

Lines

Station layout
Noshiro Station consists of two ground-level opposed side platforms serving two tracks, connected to the station building by a footbridge. The station is staffed.

Platforms

History
It was renamed Noshiro Station on 1 November 1909. With the privatization of Japanese National Railways (JNR) on 1 April 1987, the station came under the control of JR East.

Passenger statistics
In fiscal 2018, the station was used by an average of 430 passengers daily (boarding passengers only).

Surrounding area
 Noshiroekimae Post office
 Noshiro Post office
 Noshiro City hall

See also
 List of railway stations in Japan

References

External links

  

Railway stations in Japan opened in 1908
Railway stations in Akita Prefecture
Gonō Line
Stations of East Japan Railway Company
Noshiro, Akita